Humbug Mountain State Park is a state park located on the Oregon coast. It is administered by the Oregon Parks and Recreation Department.

See also
 List of Oregon state parks

References

External links
 

Parks in Curry County, Oregon
State parks of Oregon